Louis Adward Lankford (January 20, 1882 – June 1967) was an American Negro league pitcher between 1912 and 1920.

A native of Canton, Missouri, Lankford made his Negro leagues debut in 1912 for the St. Louis Giants. He went on to play for several teams, including the Lincoln Giants and Philadelphia Giants, and finished his career in 1920 with the Pennsylvania Red Caps of New York. Lankford died in New York, New York in 1967 at age 85.

References

External links
  and Seamheads

1882 births
1967 deaths
Date of death missing
Brooklyn Royal Giants players
Lincoln Giants players
Lincoln Stars (baseball) players
Pennsylvania Red Caps of New York players
Philadelphia Giants players
St. Louis Giants players
Baseball pitchers
Baseball players from Missouri
People from Canton, Missouri
20th-century African-American people